Cecidothyris is a genus of moths of the family Thyrididae from Africa.

Species
Some species of this genus are:

Cecidothyris affinia 	Whalley, 1971
Cecidothyris chrysotherma 	(Hampson, 1914)	 
Cecidothyris longicorpa 	Whalley, 1971
Cecidothyris orbiferalis 	(Gaede, 1917)
Cecidothyris parobifera 	Whalley, 1971
Cecidothyris pexa 	(Hampson, 1906)
Cecidothyris tyrannica 	Whalley, 1971

References

Thyrididae
Moth genera